The Bersntol is a valley in the Autonomous Province of Trento, in north-eastern Italy. The Fersina river runs through it. It is also known as the Valle del Mòcheni after its inhabitants, who speak the Upper German Mòcheno language.

History 
Since the 14th century the valley has been home to a Mòcheno-speaking population of Upper German origin, and is a language island of the Mòcheno language.

The valley is part of the district of Alta Valsugana e Bersntol.

Population 
The four municipalities of the valley are Vlarötz, Garait, Palai en Bersntol, and Sant'Orsola Terme. The majority of people declared themselves members of the Mòcheno linguistic group.

The Pezzata Mòchena breed of domestic goat originates in the valley.

References

External links 

 Homepage of the Bernstoler Kulturinstitut

Valleys of Trentino